Yatra (1986) is an Indian travel-based television series. It was filmed on the Himsagar Express, the longest running train of Indian Railways. The series aired on Doordarshan, and had an ensemble cast which included Om Puri, Mohan Gokhale, Ila Arun, Neena Gupta, and Raghubir Yadav, among others. It was directed by Shyam Benegal. Music for the series was composed by Vanraj Bhatia; camera work was by Jehangir Chowdhury.

This 15-part series was shot almost entirely on the Himsagar Express and the Tripura Express.

Cast 
 Om Puri as Gopalan Nair
 Mohan Gokhale as a hermit
 Ila Arun – theatre troupe member
 Neena Gupta
 Raghubir Yadav
 Ravi Jhankal – theatre troupe member
 Himani Shivpuri
 Uttara Baokar
 Rajendra Gupta  – theatre troupe member
 Harish Patel – theatre troupe member

References

External links 
 

1980s Indian television series
Indian travel television series
DD National original programming
1986 Indian television series debuts
Television series about rail transport
Works set on trains